Fala is a monotypic moth genus of the family Noctuidae. Its only species, Fala ptycophora, is found in the US state of California. Both the genus and species were first described by Augustus Radcliffe Grote in 1875.

References

External links
Original description: Proceedings of the Academy of Natural Sciences of Philadelphia: 426.

Amphipyrinae
Monotypic moth genera